The Holtkamp Round Barn is an historic building located near Salem in rural Henry County, Iowa, United States. It was built in 1918 by its first owner B.J. Holtkamp who used the plans drawn up by Matt L. King. The building is a true round barn that measures  in diameter. It is constructed of clay tile from Mt. Pleasant Brick & Tile Mfg. Co. of Mt. Pleasant, Iowa and features an aerator, hay carrier, and a two-pitch roof. It has been listed on the National Register of Historic Places since 1986.

References

Infrastructure completed in 1918
Buildings and structures in Henry County, Iowa
National Register of Historic Places in Henry County, Iowa
Barns on the National Register of Historic Places in Iowa
Round barns in Iowa